Alter Echo is the fourth studio album by the Danish rock band Dizzy Mizz Lizzy. It was released on 20 March 2020 by Sony Music.

Background 
Following the band's 2014 reunion, their third studio album Forward in Reverse in 2016 marked their first original material released in nearly 20 years. The shift from the band's more grunge-oriented music from the 1990s towards hard rock was well-received by both critics and fans, and helped Dizzy Mizz Lizzy regain their position as Denmark's most popular rock band. 

After touring Forward in Reverse, the band started to work on new material in the studio in the second half of 2017, and expected to release an album in 2018. However, the band decided to take extra time out to meet their high production quality standard. In 2018 and 2019, they continued to occasionally play shows, also trying out new songs they were working on, such as "In the Blood" and "California Rain". Album recording began in August 2019 in the privately owned Color Mill Studio. It marks the first album entirely self-produced by Tim Christensen.

Release and reception 

Alter Echo was ultimately released on 20 March 2020 to favorable reviews. The album was lauded with the GAFFA Award for "Danish rock album of the year", while it garnered Christensen his first award for "Songwriter of the year". The album's name was inspired by TC Electronic's Alter Ego echo pedal, the meaning of which refers to an altered or alternative sound, particularly marking the band's transition in sound.

Because the album hit the market in the early days of the COVID-19 pandemic, the band had to postpone their "Arena Tour" several times, playing only several smaller shows in between. The tour ultimately commenced April 2022, with the shows being widely praised.

Musical style 
Stylistically, Alter Echo continues in a similar heavier vein as Forward in Reverse, with GAFFA describing the songs as "their slowest, longest and also heaviest to date", due to their metal and progressive influences. At the same time, in addition to the instruments of the power trio, orchestral and ambient arrangements play an increasingly dominant role.

Track listing 

An instrumental version of the album, Alter Echo Instrumental, with remixed and newly mastered instrumentals of all tracks, was exclusively released on vinyl on 12 February 2021, initially to a limited run of 600 copies, but later receiving a second pressing due to high demand. The cover art is a near-inverted version of the album's visuals.

Singles and music videos 
 "California Rain"
 "In the Blood"
 "The Middle"
 "Amelia"

"California Rain" and "In the Blood" were released as singles prior to the album's release. The song "The Middle" was released on 18 September 2020 as a single, including music video. By public demand, the five-piece suite "Amelia", totaling 23 minutes, was released as a single on 27 August 2021. The music video premiered on 1 September 2021 at the Odense International Film Festival. It was made as a short film to visually tell the conceptual story told in "Amelia", about a young woman seeking help from the wrong people to get her back on track in life, resulting in a slow descent into a fanatic cult. It was directed by Marc Louis Sutton and starring Angela Bundalovic. It among other things won "Best rock music video" at the Euro Music Video Song Awards (February 2022) and "Best music video" at the 2022 San Francisco Indie Short Festival.

Personnel 
Dizzy Mizz Lizzy
 Tim Christensen – guitars, vocals, songwriter, producer, keyboards
 Martin Nielsen – bass
 Søren Friis – drums

Additional musicians
 Rune Olesen - additional percussion

Production
 Rune Nissen-Petersen - recording engineer
 Jacob Hansen – mix engineer (at Hansen Studio, Ribe, Denmark)
 Svante Forsbäck – mastering (at Chartmakers Audio Mastering, Helsinki)
 Paul Wilson – cover art, art director
 Jannick Boerlum – photography

Charts

References

2020 albums
Dizzy Mizz Lizzy albums
Sony Music Denmark albums